Jericho  is a 1937 British drama film directed by Thornton Freeland and starring Paul Robeson, Henry Wilcoxon and Wallace Ford. It was released in the US with the alternative title Dark Sands.

Paul Robeson considered Jericho one of his most positive accomplishments in projecting a screen image of a Black man with courage, honor, self-sacrifice and intelligence who achieves success and happiness. Robeson's first British film, Sanders of the River, ended up being an embarrassment for the actor, its story turning into a celebration of British colonialism. Robeson felt betrayed by the production team and sought without success to buy all circulating prints. As a result, Robeson demanded artistic control over the final cut of this film. For example, the ending was to be that Jericho, homesick, agrees to help clear the captain's name in the United States. After their plane crashes in the desert, Jericho dies trying to save Captain Mack. Instead, Robeson simply requested that the movie end with the captain flying off alone.

Plot
A World War I American troopship is torpedoed, and many soldiers are trapped below the deck. Jericho Jackson (Robeson), a medical student drafted into the war, heroically saves the trapped men, in defiance of his superior's orders to abandon ship, but accidentally kills the officer in the melee. Despite his heroism, Jericho is court-martialed for refusing orders. Embittered, he escapes. Captain Mack is held responsible for his escape and court-martialed.

Jericho ends up in North Africa, where he meets the Tuareg people. When he uses his medical skills to heal the sick, the Tuareg welcome Jericho into their tribe, and he marries and raises a family. He eventually becomes the Tuaregs' leader. He leads his people to victory over rivals and brings peace and unity to the region through which the Tuareg trek annually to trade for salt. When an anthropology film crew's coverage of the salt trek is shown in London, Captain Mack spots Jericho and vows to track him down.  However, when the captain sees how much good Jericho has done for his adopted people, he relents and flies away alone.

Cast

External links
 
 Dark Sands @ Elcinema.com

1937 films
1937 drama films
British black-and-white films
British drama films
Films directed by Thornton Freeland
Films set in Africa
Films shot in Egypt
Paul Robeson
Films shot at Pinewood Studios
American World War I films
1930s English-language films
1930s American films
1930s British films